Federica Sugamiele (born 27 April 1996) is an Italian long-distance runner. In 2020, she competed in the women's half marathon at the 2020 World Athletics Half Marathon Championships held in Gdynia, Poland.

See also
 Italian team at the running events

References

External links 
 

Living people
1996 births
Italian female middle-distance runners
Italian female long-distance runners
Italian female cross country runners
Sportspeople from the Province of Trapani
20th-century Italian women
21st-century Italian women